Geoffrey Arthur Tibble (27 February 1909 – 15 December 1952) was an English artist prominent in the Objective Abstraction movement.

Early life and studies
Tibble was born in 1909 in Reading, Berkshire, and was educated at the Reading University School of Art. At age 18, he entered the Slade School, London in 1927 under Henry Tonks, where he was a contemporary of William Coldstream.

Career in art
Tibble was a significant figure in the short-lived Objective Abstraction movement. In 1934, Tibble exhibited abstract works at the Exhibition of Objective Abstractions at the Zwemmer Gallery, London (works described as "vortices in pigment, suggesting rather than representing something in nature") He later destroyed or overpainted most of the works from this abstract period.

After briefly experimenting with surrealism, by 1937 he had returned to figurative painting, moving toward the Euston Road School of urban realism founded by William Coldstream. In 1944 he became a member of the New English Art Club. He also exhibited with the London Group, after his military service during World War II,

Tibble had his first solo exhibition at Tooth's Gallery in 1946, showing 25 paintings, all interiors with figures, a format that became his signature style and developed his wider reputation. These were critically acclaimed for their "remarkable assurance, the certainty of aim and economy of means" and their resemblance to the work of Degas.

He subsequently exhibited at leading London galleries, including the Leicester and Lefevre galleries.

Tibble died in Amersham, Buckinghamshire on 15 December 1952, aged only 43. He was survived by his wife and two daughters.

Critical reception
A review of a retrospective exhibition said "His work—dingy but packed with period atmosphere—looks back towards the intimate interiors of Vuillard, and forward to the domestic squalor of the Kitchen Sink School".

References

Secondary sources
Geoffrey Tibble. Wives & Daughters, Jonathan Clark Fine Art, London (2002)
Retrospective Exhibition Catalogue, City of Manchester Art Gallery, (1958)

External links
Works by Geoffrey Tibble in Tate Britain

1909 births
1952 deaths
20th-century English painters
Alumni of the Slade School of Fine Art
Alumni of the University of Reading
Artists from Reading, Berkshire
British military personnel of World War II
English male painters
Painters from London
20th-century English male artists